Loch Skerrow Halt railway station served the burgh of Skerrow, Dumfries and Galloway, Scotland, from 1955 to 1963 on the Portpatrick and Wigtownshire Joint Railway.

History 
The station opened on 13 June 1955 by the Portpatrick and Wigtownshire Joint Railway. It had a siding and a signal box. With a sparse local population, there was no longer a need for a station, so it closed on 9 September 1963. The line was closed in 1965.

Popular culture
Richard Hannay, the hero of the 1915 novel The Thirty-Nine Steps, by John Buchan, reputedly got off a train here, fearing that he had become the prime suspect in a couple of murders in London.

References

External links 

Disused railway stations in Dumfries and Galloway
Former Portpatrick and Wigtownshire Joint Railway stations
Railway stations in Great Britain opened in 1955
Railway stations in Great Britain closed in 1963
Beeching closures in Scotland
1955 establishments in Scotland
1963 disestablishments in Scotland